Nariño is a town and municipality in the Nariño Department, Colombia.

Climate
Nariño has a subtropical highland climate (Köppen Cfb) with heavy rainfall most of the year and a drier season from June to September.

References

Municipalities of Nariño Department